Cri-Cri is a fictional character, an anthropomorphic cricket, created by Francisco Gabilondo Soler in 1934 while broadcasting his own musical radio show on Mexico's station XEW.

History 
Cri-Cri is a fictional character, an anthropomorphic cricket, created by Francisco Gabilondo Soler in 1934 while broadcasting his own musical radio show on Mexico's station XEW.

Cri-Cri is known as the "grillito cantor" or "the singing cricket". He was created by Gabilondo Soler in his childhood and may even be considered "his inner personality".

The character became so famous and gave its author such renown, that it became a second name for Gabilondo. In the mid part of the 20th century he became the most recognizable singer of children's songs in Spanish. Gabilondo's dedication to this segment of the population has been greatly admired, comparable to Walt Disney in his honest approach to making life fun for those who are beginning to live it.

Legacy 
Walt Disney himself saw the popularity and honesty in Soler's character, and approached Soler to purchase the rights for Cri-Cri. Soler declined, telling Disney that Cri-Cri was a legacy for Mexican children to cherish. Disney offered to animate one of Cri-Cri's most popular songs "Cochinitos Dormilones" (Sleepy Piggies), and incorporated aspects of his own Three Little Pigs short into it. In time, Walt Disney created Jiminy Cricket, inspired by the famous Mexican character.

The character is the brand ambassador for Banco Bilbao Vizcaya Argentaria.

References

External links
 Music files and lyrics in Spanish

Fictional crickets
Male characters in radio
Fictional Mexican people
Radio characters introduced in 1934
Insects in popular culture